Anandan is a surname. Notable people with the surname include:

Anathalavattom Anandan (born 1937), Indian politician
K. Murugesan Anandan (born 1951), Indian politician
M. Anandan, Indian politician
M. S. M. Anandan, Indian politician
Subhas Anandan (1947–2015), Singaporean lawyer